Faridpur-5 is a defunct constituency represented in the Jatiya Sangsad (National Parliament) of Bangladesh abolished in 2006.

Members of Parliament

References

External links 

 

Cumilla District
Former parliamentary constituencies of Bangladesh
1973 establishments in Bangladesh
2006 disestablishments